Milothris marmorea is a species of beetle in the family Cerambycidae, and the only species in the genus Milothris. It was described by Schönherr in 1817.

References

Pteropliini
Beetles described in 1817